K XVIII was one of five K XIV class submarines built for the Royal Netherlands Navy. She served during World War II.

Service history
The submarine was laid down in Rotterdam at the shipyard of Fijenoord on 10 June 1931. The launch took place on 27 September 1932.
On 23 March 1934 the boat was commissioned in the Dutch navy. From 20 June to 1 August 1934 K XVIII,  and  made a trip to the Baltic Sea. The ports of Gdynia, Königsberg, Riga and Copenhagen were visited.

On 14 November 1934 the boat was sent to the Dutch East Indies, where she arrived on 11 July 1935 in Surabaya. On 6 September 1938 she participated in a fleet show at Surabaya. The show was held in honor of the Dutch Queen Wilhelmina of the Netherlands who celebrating her fortieth year as head of state. More than twenty navy ships participated in the show.

In the war K XVIII sank several Japanese ships. On 24 January 1942 the boat was severely damaged by Japanese depth charges and was forced to return to Surabaya to be repaired. While still under repair at Surabaya she was scuttled on 2 March 1942 in order to prevent the Japanese from capturing the boat. K XVIII was raised by the Japanese in 1944 and converted into an air warning picket hulk and deployed in the Madura Strait. On 16 June 1945 the hulk was sunk by the British submarine Taciturn.

Summary of raiding history
Ships sunk and damaged by K XVIII.

References

1932 ships
Ships built in Schiedam
K XIV-class submarines
Scuttled vessels
Naval ships of the Netherlands captured by Japan during World War II
Ships sunk by British submarines
Maritime incidents in March 1942
Submarines sunk by submarines
Submarines built by Wilton-Fijenoord